William Francis Murray (September 7, 1881 – September 21, 1918) was a U.S. Representative from Massachusetts and the Postmaster of Boston.

Born in Boston, Massachusetts, Murray attended the public schools and the Boston Latin School.
He was graduated from Harvard University in 1904 and from Harvard Law School in 1906.
Practiced law in Boston.
He served during the Spanish–American War as a corporal in the United States Volunteer Signal Corps.
He served as member of Boston Common Council in 1904 and 1905.
He served as member of the State house of representatives in 1907 and 1908.
He served as member of the Governor's council in 1910.

Election to Congress
Murray was elected as a Democrat to the Sixty-second and Sixty-third Congresses. He served as a Member of Congress from March 4, 1911, until September 28, 1914, when he resigned, having been appointed postmaster of Boston.

Postmaster of Boston
On June 19, 1914, President Wilson nominated Murray for the position of Postmaster of Boston., the Senate Confirmed the nomination on July 16, 1914. Murray served as postmaster from October 1, 1914, until his death on September 21, 1918.

Death
In the Autumn of 1918 Murray contracted the Spanish flu and died from pneumonia at Boston City Hospital at 11:40 on the night of September 21, 1918.

Burial
Murray was interred in Holyhood Cemetery, the Chestnut Hill section of Brookline, Massachusetts.

References

Bibliography
 Who's who in State Politics, 1912 Practical Politics (1912) p. 24.

1881 births
1918 deaths
Harvard College alumni
Harvard Law School alumni
Democratic Party members of the Massachusetts House of Representatives
United States Army non-commissioned officers
Deaths from Spanish flu
Democratic Party members of the United States House of Representatives from Massachusetts
20th-century American politicians
19th-century American politicians
Boston Latin School alumni
Deaths from pneumonia in Massachusetts
Burials at Holyhood Cemetery (Brookline)
Politicians from Boston
American military personnel of the Spanish–American War